The East India Championships  also known as the East India Lawn Tennis Championships was a combined men's and women's grass court tennis tournament founded in 1920. The championships were played at the Calcutta South Club, Calcutta, Bengal, India and ran until 1970 before they were discontinued.

History
Tennis was introduced to India in 1880s by British Army and Civilian Officers.. In 1920 the East India Championships were founded. In 1969 the East India Championships were held in conjunction with the All Assam Hard Court Championships. The championships ran until 1970 before they were discontinued.

Venue
The Calcutta South Club was founded in 1920. It's current facilities consist of the six original grass courts, In 1985 the Club built six new clay courts, and in 2004 it added five asphalt-based rubberized hard courts.

References

Defunct tennis tournaments in India
Grass court tennis tournaments